Gao is a city in Mali and the capital of Gao Region.

Gao or GAO may also refer to:

Places
 Gao (department), a commune of Ziro Province, Burkina Faso
 Gao County, in Sichuan, People's Republic of China
 Gao, a village in Poyang County, Jiangxi Province, People's Republic of China
 Gao, Iran
 Gao Empire, ancient state in Mali
 Gao Region, a region of Mali
 Gao Cercle, an administrative subdivision of Gao Region

Languages
 Gao language, spoken in the Solomon Islands
 Gao dialect of the Koyraboro Senni Songhay language spoken in Mali
 Gao-Yang Yue, spoken in the southwestern Guangdong, China

Battles
 Battle of Gao, the first of several battles in the 2012 Northern Mali conflict
 Second Battle of Gao
 Third Battle of Gao
 Fourth Battle of Gao
 Fifth Battle of Gao

Other uses
 Laccosperma secundiflorum, a species of tropical palm tree
 Faidherbia albida, an economically important species of tree found in Africa and the Middle East 
 Gao (mansa), Mansa of the Mali Empire 1300–1305
 Gao (surname) (高), a Chinese family name
 Gao-Guenie, a meteorite that fell in 1960 in Burkina Faso
 Government Accountability Office (GAO), the audit, evaluation, and investigative arm of the United States Congress
 Gao, a character in the manga Phoenix
 Gao Gao, a giant panda
 Gao Village, featured in the classic Chinese novel Journey to the West

See also 
 Gaos (disambiguation)
 Goa (disambiguation)